Marcel Granollers and Ben McLachlan were the defending champions but chose not to defend their title.

Julian Cash and Henry Patten won the title after defeating Aleksandr Nedovyesov and Aisam-ul-Haq Qureshi 4–6, 6–3, [11–9] in the final.

Seeds

Draw

References

External links
 Main draw

Surbiton Trophy - Men's doubles
2022 men's doubles